Stephen Lea Sheppard (born January 26, 1983) is a Canadian writer and former television and film actor. He played Dudley Heinsbergen in the 2001 Wes Anderson film The Royal Tenenbaums and geek guru Harris Trinsky on NBC dramedy Freaks and Geeks.

Sheppard was born in Gibsons, British Columbia, northwest of Vancouver. On a commentary track for the Freaks and Geeks episode, "Looks and Books”, Judd Apatow shared that he gave Wes Anderson an "acting reel" he made of Sheppard's performance on the show, in order to help Sheppard get his Royal Tenenbaums role. These two roles remain Sheppard's only on-camera acting credits.

Beginning in 2007, he has co-authored several modules for the role playing game Exalted.

Sheppard lives in Surrey, British Columbia.

References

External links

1983 births
Living people
21st-century Canadian male actors
Canadian male film actors
Canadian male television actors
Male actors from British Columbia
People from Gibsons, British Columbia